Zawada Pilicka  is a village in the administrative district of Gmina Irządze, within Zawiercie County, Silesian Voivodeship, in southern Poland.

References

Zawada Pilicka